Una voglia da morire is a 1965 Italian drama film directed by Duccio Tessari.

Cast
Annie Girardot	as 	Eleonora
Raf Vallone	as	Eleonora's Husband
Régine Ohann	as	Clara
Alberto Lionello	as	Clara's Husband
Sophie Daumier
Michel Lemoine
Carlo Giordana
Lorella De Luca
Giuliano Giunti
Calisto Calisti
Mario Lanfranchi

References

External links
 

1965 films
1960s Italian-language films
1965 drama films
Films directed by Duccio Tessari
Italian drama films
1960s Italian films